The cataract-microcornea syndrome is the association of congenital cataract and microcornea.

Genetics 

Mutations in ABCA3 were found to be associated to this syndrome.

Diagnosis

Treatment

References

External links 

Syndromes affecting the eye